Micranthes nidifica, the peak saxifrage,  is a species of plant in the saxifrage family. It is native to the northwestern United States, where it grows in moist habitat, often in mountainous areas. It is a perennial herb growing from a caudex and system of rhizomes and producing a basal rosette of leaves. Each leaf is up to 10 centimeters long with a smooth-edged or minutely toothed blade on a thin petiole. The inflorescence arises on a peduncle up to half a meter tall and bears clusters of flowers with white petals.

External links
Jepson Manual Treatment: var. nidifica
Photo gallery

nidifica